Sanjay Yadav may refer to:

 Sanjay Yadav (cricketer) (born 1995), Indian cricketer
 Sanjay Yadav (judge) (born 1959), Indian judge
 Sanjay Yadav (Uttar Pradesh politician) (born 1979), Indian politician
 Sanjay Singh Yadav, writer